UFC Fight Night: Maynard vs. Diaz (also known as UFC Fight Night 20) was a mixed martial arts event held by the Ultimate Fighting Championship (UFC) on January 11, 2010 at the Patriot Center in Fairfax, Virginia.

Background
Nik Lentz was expected to face Jeremy Stephens at the event.  However, Stephens pulled out of the bout with an injury and was replaced by Thiago Tavares.

A bout between Josh Koscheck and Mike Pierce was expected to take place on this card. However, Koscheck was shifted from this event to a bout with Anthony Johnson at UFC 106, while Pierce would face Jon Fitch at UFC 107.

Mike Massenzio was expected to face Gerald Harris, but was forced off the card with an injury and replaced by John Salter.

Results

Bonus awards
Fighters were awarded $30,000 bonuses.

Fight of the Night: Tom Lawlor vs. Aaron Simpson
Knockout of the Night: Gerald Harris
Submission of the Night: Evan Dunham

Reported payout
The following is the reported payout to the fighters as reported to the Virginia Department of Professional and Occupational Regulation. It does not include sponsor money or "locker room" bonuses often given by the UFC and also do not include the UFC's traditional "fight night" bonuses.

Gray Maynard: $40,000 (includes $20,000 win bonus) def. Nate Diaz: $24,000
Evan Dunham: $18,000 ($9,000 win bonus) def. Efrain Escudero: $15,000
Aaron Simpson: $22,000 ($11,000 win bonus) def. Tom Lawlor: $10,000
Amir Sadollah: $30,000 ($15,000 win bonus) def. Brad Blackburn: $13,000
Chris Leben: $60,000 ($30,000 win bonus) def. Jay Silva: $6,000
Rick Story: $10,000 ($5,000 win bonus) def. Jesse Lennox: $7,000
Nick Lentz: $7,000 vs. Thiago Tavares: $15,000 ^
Rory MacDonald: $12,000 ($6,000 win bonus) def. Mike Guymon: $6,000
Rafael dos Anjos: $16,000 ($8,000 win bonus) def. Kyle Bradley: $8,000
Gerald Harris: $12,000 ($6,000 win bonus) def. John Salter: $6,000
Nick Catone: $14,000 ($7,000 win bonus) def. Jesse Forbes: $6,000

^ Both fighters earned show money; bout declared majority draw.

References

See also
 Ultimate Fighting Championship
 List of UFC champions
 List of UFC events
 2010 in UFC

UFC Fight Night
2010 in mixed martial arts
Mixed martial arts in Virginia
Sports in Fairfax, Virginia
2010 in sports in Virginia
January 2010 sports events in the United States